Los Sánchez is a Mexican telenovela that started on September 20, 2004 and ended on January 13, 2006. It starred Luis Felipe Tovar, Martha Mariana Castro, Leticia Huijara, Libertad and Alejandro Bracho.

Los Sanchez is one of two Mexican versions of the Argentine telenovela Los Roldan; the other version being Una Familia Con Suerte.

Plot
Along the four seasons the Mexican audience knew about Tito Sánchez and his family, a very traditional Mexican family that suddenly becomes rich, when Mercedes Lozada, one of the richest women of Mexico, meets Tito Sánchez when she's trying to commit suicide and he saves her life, she is sick (cancer) and she's gonna die soon, so she thanks him and names him as the President of her company Lozada Corporation.

Sánchez lives with his sister in law, Yoli (Martha Mariana Castro) who is deeply in love with him but she's kept that as secret for so many years. Yoli's sister, so Tito's wife,  died 6 years ago so Yoli helps Tito with his children: Leo, Hilda, María and Maxi and treats them as if they were her own kids. Tito also lives with his brother Raúl (better known as Laisa Libertad) who is homosexual and is always dressed as a woman, he also acts that way.

First season
When Tito and his family get rich, they move to a very nice house, they meet then their neighbours, the Uriarte family, they are Emilio (Alejandro Bracho), Charito (Leticia Huijara) and Facundo (Leo Rey). They always try to make Los Sánchez life impossible, but Emilio falls in love with Laisa, he's the only one who doesn't notice that Laisa is not a woman. Charito falls in love with Omar (María's boyfriend, he's considered as part of the Sánchez family and he's younger than Charito) and Facundo is in love with Hilda, one of Tito's daughter.

Tito meets Cecilia (Martha Christiana), a beautiful, elegant and smart woman and falls in love with her, Yoli gets very sad because Tito starts to prefer Cecilia and doesn't realize what Yoli feels, so Yoli decides to confess her feelings and tells Tito that she's in love with him, with no answer from his part...

Trying to forget, Yoli lives a romance with Paul Manzini (Luis Miguel Lombana) who is Emilio's best friend, he loves Yoli but after a month she ends that relationship for she can't forget Tito, finally Tito ends his relationship with Cecilia and gives a chance to Yoli, even when he's still in love with Cecilia.

The first season ends with the cancellation of Yoli and Tito's wedding, after Cecilia leaves pregnant, Cecilia never comes back again but Yoli doesn't want to marry Tito because she doesn't want him to suffer.

Second season
The story goes its way on the second season but at the end some characters don't appear anymore: Paul Manzini, Charito, Emilio and Facundo are some of them, this season ends with Tito and Yoli's wedding, when he finally accepts that he loves her and she tells him that she's pregnant.

Third season
The third season comes with a lot of fantasy on it, an angel that takes care of the family, new characters that don't catch the audience's attention anymore, so after a great success Los Sánchez ends with the traditional happy ending.

References

Mexican telenovelas
TV Azteca telenovelas
2004 telenovelas
2004 Mexican television series debuts
2006 Mexican television series endings
Mexican television series based on Argentine television series
Spanish-language telenovelas